Dirty Words is the debut album by British indie rock band the Departure, released in the UK on 13 June 2005.

Track listing
All tracks written by David Jones, Sam Harvey, Ben Winton, Lee Irons, and Andy Hobson.
"Just Like TV" – 4:42
"Talkshow" – 3:06
"Only Human" – 3:30
"All Mapped Out" – 3:01
"Arms Around Me" – 4:21
"Lump in My Throat" – 3:20
"Don't Come Any Closer" – 3:28
"Changing Pilots" – 3:57
"Be My Enemy" – 3:24
"Time" – 4:25
"Dirty Words" – 3:26

Bonus tracks
"The City Blurs Your Eyes" (Japan only bonus track, released in the UK as the B-side to the "Lump in My Throat" single)
"This New Craze" (Japan only bonus track, released in the UK as the B-side to the "All Mapped Out" reissue single)

Release details
The album has been released in various countries. At this time it is only available in North America via import.

References

2005 debut albums
The Departure albums
Parlophone albums
Albums produced by Steve Osborne